Mississauga MetroStars (briefly known as MetroStars Canada in 2019) were a professional indoor soccer team which played its home games at the Paramount Fine Foods Centre in Mississauga, a suburb of Toronto, Ontario, Canada. The team joined the Major Arena Soccer League for the 2018–19 season. The club featured former Toronto FC players Dwayne De Rosario, Molham Babouli and Adrian Cann on the roster in its first season. Just as the 2019–20 season began, it was announced the team would cease operations.

History

Background
Historically the Canadian professional indoor soccer landscape consisted of Canadian franchises in American leagues particularly in the North American Soccer League (NASL) and the National Professional Soccer League (NPSL). The height of Canadian participation in indoor soccer occurred during the 1980–81 and 1981–82 NASL seasons when four Canadian clubs participated simultaneously.  The height of Canadian participation in the NPSL would eventually expand to include four teams, which consisted of the Edmonton Drillers, Montreal Impact, Toronto Shooting Stars, and Toronto ThunderHawks.  After the demise of the NPSL in 2001 the country was without a professional league structure, until the creation of the Canadian Major Indoor Soccer League (CMISL) in 2007. The league served as the first exclusively Canadian professional indoor soccer league, and was primarily based in Western Canada until it ceased operations in 2012.

In 2017, the Canadian Arena Soccer Association (CASA) was founded as the governing body for the sport in Canada. The CASA sanctioned the developmental Youth Arena Premier League and the semi-professional Arena Premier League – both based in Mississauga. The purpose of the Arena Premier League was to develop and provide talent to the Canadian national indoor team, and later to the MetroStars.

Formation and dissolution
The MetroStars were founded in 2018 and were one of 17 participants in the 2018–19 Major Arena Soccer League season. They made their debut on December 1 against the defending league champion Baltimore Blast. According to team owner Gladiator Sports, the MetroStars payroll for the year was about $500,000. The team finished the 2018–19 season 15th in the league with a record of 4 wins, 20 losses, and ranked 14th in attendance with an average of 1,020 per game.

For the 2019–20 season, the team rebranded as MetroStars Canada. They planned to play their 12 home games in six cities across Ontario (St. Catharines, Kingston, Oshawa, Windsor, Sarnia, and Brampton) to spread awareness for the sport. Before playing a single game that season, the Major Arena Soccer League published a revised schedule that did not include the MetroStars. Six days later, the team confirmed that they would not be participating in the season due to issues coordinating their home matches.

2018–19 roster

Active players
As of 24 August 2019

Inactive players

Head coaches

Records

Year-by-year

References

External links
Official website

Defunct Major Arena Soccer League teams
Soccer clubs in Ontario
Sport in Mississauga
Canadian indoor soccer teams
2018 establishments in Ontario
Association football clubs established in 2018
Association football clubs disestablished in 2019
2019 disestablishments in Ontario